Christopher J Godfrey  (born May 17, 1958 in Detroit, Michigan) is a former American football guard in the National Football League, primarily for the New York Giants.  He started in Super Bowl XXI and honored as the New York Giants Alumni Man of the Year. Godfrey played college football at the University of Michigan. He also played with the Michigan Panthers of the USFL. His daughters Mary Grace, top international childrenswear designer and couture dressmaker, and Anastassia were members of the Michigan Wolverines swim team, his son Michael played football at Saint Joseph High School, and his son John was a defensive lineman for the Ball State Cardinals football team.

References

1958 births
Living people
American football offensive linemen
Michigan Wolverines football players
New York Jets players
Green Bay Packers players
New York Giants players
Seattle Seahawks players
Michigan Panthers players